The first season of the animated show Metalocalypse originally aired on Adult Swim from August 6 to December 17, 2006, with 20 episodes. The show follows virtual death metal band Dethklok. The majority of the music featured this season was released on the 2007 album, The Dethalbum.

In late March 2013, this season became available on Netflix. In May 2015, this season became available on Hulu Plus.

Guests
This season featured several musicians as voice actors, such as Kirk Hammett and James Hetfield of Metallica, Michael Amott of Arch Enemy, Steve Smyth, Warrel Dane and Jeff Loomis of Nevermore, George "Corpsegrinder" Fisher of Cannibal Corpse and King Diamond of the eponymous band. Comedians Laraine Newman, Andy Richter, and Laura Silverman also appeared as voice actors.

DVD special features
Disc One
Murderface's bass solo ("Birthdayface" extended scene)
The Skwisgaar Skwigelf Advanced Fast Hand Finger Wizard Master Class Instructional Video
Ravenwood learning from Skwisgaar Skwigelf Advanced Fast Hand Finger Wizard Master Class
Thunderhorse – Skwisgaar's music video outtakes
Nathan Explosion reading William Shakespeare's Hamlet (extended scene)
Murderface plays "Wheelchair Bound" (extended scene)

Disc Two
Main menu
9 band interviews
Mordhaus tour
Murder Reel 
Episodes menu
Toki's codpiece ("Murdering Outside the Box" uncensored scene)
Salacia teaser
Burzum's food menu
Nathan's Groupies ("Girlfriendklok" uncensored scene)
Pickles' "Scourge of Drugs"

Episodes

See also

 List of Adult Swim home videos

References

2006 American television seasons
Metalocalypse seasons